Robert 'Bob' Mark (28 November 1937 – 21 July 2006) was a professional tennis player from Australia.

Mark won the Australian Men's Doubles title in 1959, 1960 and 1961 partnering Rod Laver. With Sandra Reynolds, he won the 1960 Australian Mixed Doubles, and in 1961, he teamed with compatriot Margaret Smith to win the U.S. National Championships Mixed Doubles.

In 1962, he won the singles title at the South African Championships after a four-set victory in the final against Gordon Forbes.

Grand slam finals

Doubles (3 titles, 4 runner-ups)

Mixed Doubles: (2 titles, 1 runner-ups)

References

External links
 
 
 
 Biography of Bob Mark

Australian Championships (tennis) champions
Australian Championships (tennis) junior champions
Australian male tennis players
Sportspeople from Albury
Tennis people from New South Wales
1937 births
2006 deaths
Grand Slam (tennis) champions in mixed doubles
Grand Slam (tennis) champions in men's doubles
Grand Slam (tennis) champions in boys' singles
Grand Slam (tennis) champions in boys' doubles
20th-century Australian people
21st-century Australian people